CFBG-FM is a hot adult contemporary radio station broadcasting at 99.5 FM in Bracebridge, Ontario and is owned by the Vista Broadcast Group.

History
The station originally began broadcasting at 100.9 FM in 1988, however, in the CRTC decision, the proposed frequency was 107.7 MHz. The station was originally operated by a partnership between Telemedia and local company Muskoka-Parry Sound Broadcasting, the owner of CFBK-FM in Huntsville. During this era, CFBG aired a mix of locally produced programming and simulcasting of CFBK.

CFBG was acquired by Haliburton Broadcasting Group in 1997. The station moved to its current frequency at 99.5 FM in 2002 with the on-air branding 99.5 Moose FM.

On April 23, 2012, Vista Broadcast Group, which owns a number of radio stations in western Canada, announced a deal to acquire Haliburton Broadcasting, in cooperation with Westerkirk Capital. The transaction was approved by the CRTC on October 19, 2012.

References

External links
99.5 Moose FM
 

Bracebridge, Ontario
Fbg
Fbg
Fbg
Radio stations established in 1987
1987 establishments in Ontario